Justin Ross Yoder (born November 9, 1986) is a former soapbox racer. He was the first child with a disability  to drive a soapbox in the All American Soapbox Derby. In 1996, he challenged the regulations to allow children with disabilities to use a hand brake instead of the required foot brake. Thanks to him, regulations were changed. The hand brake is now called the Justin Brake in his honor.

Yoder has Spina Bifida and Hydrocephalus. His story is told in the film Miracle in Lane 2 starring Frankie Muniz.

Yoder is a Mennonite and attends the same church as the film's screenwriters Don Yost and Joel Kauffmann.

As of 2006, Yoder is a student at Goshen College in Goshen, Indiana, and is majoring in American Sign Language Interpreting.

References

External links

Justin Yoder ('05): "Frosh surprised by caring classmates", Bethany Christian School Bulletin, pp. 6–7, Summer 2002 edition. (Retrieved April 26, 2007)

1986 births
Living people
People from Elkhart County, Indiana
Goshen College alumni
Sportspeople from Indiana
People with spina bifida